Lensen Glacier is a tributary glacier that flows northeast to enter Pearl Harbor Glacier just east of Mount Pearson, in the Victory Mountains of Victoria Land, Antarctica. It was named by the New Zealand Federated Mountain Clubs Antarctic Expedition (NZFMCAE), 1962–63, for G.J. Lensen, a member of the New Zealand Geological Survey Antarctic Expedition, 1957–58, that worked in the Tucker Glacier area.

References

Glaciers of Borchgrevink Coast